Orobanche pinorum is a species of broomrape known by the common name conifer broomrape. It is native to the forests of western North America, where it is a parasite growing attached to the roots of other plants, usually Holodiscus species. As a parasite taking its nutrients from a host plant, it lacks leaves and chlorophyll and is brownish or yellowish in color.

Reproduction
Orobanche pinorum is predominantly autogamous. It produces about 700 seeds per capsule and over 70,000 seeds per plant. There are some evidence of xenogamy, but potential pollinators were rarely observed.

References

Further reading

External links
UC CalPhotos gallery of Orobanche pinorum

pinorum
Flora of Northwestern Mexico
Flora of the Western United States
Flora of California
Flora of the Cascade Range
Flora of the Rocky Mountains
Least concern biota of Mexico
Least concern flora of the United States